Ilkka Tuomisto (born 19 January 1984) is a Finnish male Paralympic cross-country skier and biathlete. He has represented Finland at the Paralympics in 2010 and 2014 claiming two medals in his Paralympic career.

Biography 
Tuomisto was born on 19 January 1984 with his left arm got amputated at his birth. He received his first prosthetic arm at the age of five. He took the sport of skiing at the age of 18.

Career 
Tuomisto made his first appearance at the Winter Paralympics in 2010 and managed to claim a bronze medal in the men's 1 km Sprint Classic standing category. He was also the flagbearer for Finland at the 2010 Winter Paralympics during the opening ceremony of the multi-sport event.

He also took part in the 2014 Winter Paralympics and clinched a silver medal in the men's classic style standing category.

He is qualified to compete at the 2018 Winter Paralympics and took a bronze medal in the men's 1.5 km Sprint Classic standing category.

References

External links 
 

1984 births
Living people
Finnish male cross-country skiers
Finnish male biathletes
Cross-country skiers at the 2010 Winter Paralympics
Cross-country skiers at the 2014 Winter Paralympics
Paralympic cross-country skiers of Finland
Paralympic silver medalists for Finland
Paralympic bronze medalists for Finland
Medalists at the 2010 Winter Paralympics
Medalists at the 2014 Winter Paralympics
People from Hämeenkyrö
Cross-country skiers at the 2018 Winter Paralympics
Medalists at the 2018 Winter Paralympics
Paralympic medalists in cross-country skiing
Sportspeople from Pirkanmaa
21st-century Finnish people